Sonny Rollins and the Contemporary Leaders is a 1958 album by jazz saxophonist Sonny Rollins, recorded for the Contemporary label, featuring performances by Rollins with Hampton Hawes, Barney Kessel, Leroy Vinnegar, and Shelly Manne with Victor Feldman added on one track. It was the last studio record Rollins made in the 1950s. Following the recording of "Sonny Rollins and the Contemporary Leaders", Rollins toured Europe in the spring of 1959, then took a hiatus from recording and performing in public that ended in 1962 with his LP The Bridge.

Reception
The Allmusic review by Scott Yanow states: "The last of the classic Sonny Rollins albums prior to his unexpected three-year retirement features the great tenor... on an unusual but inspired list of standards. Rollins creates explorative and often witty improvisations.... Great music."

Track listing
 "I've Told Ev'ry Little Star" (Oscar Hammerstein II, Jerome Kern) - 5:28
 "Rock-A-Bye Your Baby with a Dixie Melody" (Sam M. Lewis, Jean Schwartz, Joe Young) - 4:55
 "How High the Moon" (Nancy Hamilton, Morgan Lewis) - 7:45
 "You" (Harold Adamson, Walter Donaldson) - 4:16
 "I've Found a New Baby" (Jack Palmer, Spencer Williams) - 3:40
 "I've Found a New Baby" [alternate take] (Palmer, Williams) -	4:25 bonus track on compact disc reissue
 "Alone Together" (Howard Dietz, Arthur Schwartz) - 6:01
 "In the Chapel in the Moonlight" (Billy Hill) - 6:41
 "The Song Is You" (Hammerstein, Kern) - 5:44
 "The Song Is You" [alternate take] (Hammerstein, Kern) - 6:11 bonus track on compact disc reissue

Personnel
 Sonny Rollins – tenor saxophone
 Hampton Hawes - piano except track 3
 Barney Kessel - guitar
 Leroy Vinnegar - bass
 Shelly Manne - drums except tracks 3 & 8
 Victor Feldman - vibes on track 4

References

1958 albums
Contemporary Records albums
Sonny Rollins albums